Mihkel Juhkami (born 12 July 1963) is an Estonian politician. He was a member of XI Riigikogu and the Mayor of Rakvere from 2013 until 2017.

References

1963 births
Living people
Isamaa politicians
Members of the Riigikogu, 2007–2011
Mayors of places in Estonia
Place of birth missing (living people)